were institutions serving as homes and bases of operations for Ryukyuan missions in early modern Fuzhou (Fujian province, China) and Kagoshima (Satsuma Domain, Japan).

Fuzhou
The Chinese Ryūkyū-kan (Liúqiú guǎn in Mandarin Chinese pinyin) is located in the city of Fuzhou. Along with the nearby Kaido-kan and Kokushi-kan, it housed visiting dignitaries and scholars en route between Ryukyu and the Chinese capital of Nanjing or Beijing. In addition to officials sent by the kingdom to engage in formal diplomatic matters, Ryukyu regularly sent a small number of students to study a variety of traditional Chinese subjects in the capital, primarily in preparation for careers in the kingdom's government and bureaucracy.

Kagoshima
The Ryūkyū-kan in Kagoshima was located below the castle, on the site occupied today by Nagata Middle School and governmental food provisions offices.

It played a central role in relations between the Ryukyu Kingdom and the han (feudal domain) to which it was a vassal after 1609, serving a function not unlike a modern-day embassy. Visiting dignitaries lived and worked in the Ryūkyū-kan, as did students studying classic subjects in preparation for careers in the kingdom's bureaucracy, and a number of Ryukyuan permanent residents of the city. Satsuma's control over the Ryukyuan officials was tight, however; wandering or loitering in the area around the building was forbidden, and guards posted at the entrance checked visitors in and out. Ryukyuans could travel around the city, and to other parts of the country, only on official business, and under tight supervision and strict regulations. Similarly strict policies applied to Japanese visiting the institution.

The building was destroyed by British naval gunfire during the Bombardment of Kagoshima in 1863.

See also
Waegwan, Japanese diplomatic institution in Busan, Korea.

References

"The Rekidai Hoan: An Introduction to Documents of the Ryukyu Kingdom." Kyoto Review of Southeast Asia 3 (March 2003). 15 pages.
Sakai, Robert K. "The Satsuma-Ryukyu Trade and the Tokugawa Seclusion Policy." Journal of Asian Studies. 23:3 (May 1964). pp391–403.
『薩摩と琉球』。鹿児島県の県立図書館。("Satsuma and Ryukyu." Kagoshima Prefectural Library Official Site.) https://web.archive.org/web/20071023171033/http://www.pref.kagoshima.jp/kentosho/shiryo/kityou-490.html Accessed 10 October 2007. (Source in Japanese.)

External links
 (Kagoshima)
 (Fuzhou)

Foreign relations of the Ryukyu Kingdom
Diplomatic buildings
Former buildings and structures in Japan
Former buildings and structures in China
History of the foreign relations of Japan
History of the foreign relations of China